Sheffield Airport may refer to:

 Sheffield City Airport in Sheffield, England
 Doncaster Sheffield Airport in Finningley, Doncaster, England